Santurtzi is a port town in the province of Biscay, in the autonomous community of Basque Country, Spain. It is located in the Bilbao Abra bay, near the mouth of the Nervión river, on its left bank, 14 km downriver from Bilbao and forms part of the Greater Bilbao agglomeration. It has a population of 45,853 (2019) and a land area of 6.77 km².

The district of Santurce of the city of San Juan, Puerto Rico derives its name from Santurtzi.

History and Toponyms 
According to legends, the current church of St. George was originally founded as a monastery by English monks fleeing from religious persecution. They established themselves on the Basque coast, specifically the Somorrostro Valley, from which would later develop the town of Santurtzi.

The name Santurtzi is derived from the Latin Sant Georgi, as was the hermitage in Gordejuela near current Oquendo. In neighbouring Cantabria, Burgos and Araba exist several towns with variations of the same name: Santurde, Santiurde de Reinosa and Santurdejo. 

The Spanish language form Santurce first appeared in 1333, whilst its Basque counterpart would first be shown written in 1372. During the Middle Ages it could also be found referred to as San Jurdic, San Yurdie, Sturse and Santursi, amongst others. In current day, both names are used interchangeably, with certain preference given to Santurtzi, given its frequent use in Spanish.

The official name of the municipality has also seen various changes. During the 19th century it was officially considered to be Santurce, however in 1901 it was divided in two. The inland part of this division would become Santurce Ortuella, as the mining town of Ortuella had grown enough to promote itself as the largest urban conglomeration of Santurce. The coastal side maintained its population base in Santurtzi, and began to be called Old Santurce. The cultural and traditional relationship between the two divisions can still be observed in the border area of Kabiezes.

Geography

In general, Santurtzi has a very rough orography, although excluding Mount Serantes (452m) - one of its most symbolic topographic elements - it is not at high altitude, the significant heights being spurs of the Serantes (Serandi): The Mallet (245m) and the Fortified Heights (123 and 106m). Its relief is contained within the north flank of the anticline of Biscay. It is a structural type relief composed of urgonian limestone from the Cretaceous period found all throughout Punta Lucero-Serantes, smoothly inclined towards the Estuary of Bilbao.

The climate in Santurtzi pertains to the humid oceanic climate type. The temperatures are moderate throughout the year, with more frequent rains in spring and autumn. Winters are mild and summers not excessively warm. The average temperature is 20 °C (70ªF) in summer and 8 °C (48ªF) in winter.

Demographics

Mayors

Geographic location

Tourism 
The life in the area is focused on the sea, which inspires its work and its leisure. Fishing boat and rowing boat races, and the celebrations of the Virgin of the Carmen are carried out each year.

Events and festivities
 Easter Monday - Pascua - Cornites
 April 23, San Jorge 
 June 24, San Juan, San Juan neighbourhood
 June 29, San Pedro (Cabieces neighbourhood)
 July 16, Virgen del Carmen
 September 8, Virgen del Mar (Mamariga neighbourhood)

Monuments
San Jorge church (1725, the tower in 1844)
House Toasts (1890)
Town Hall (1905)
Monument to Cristóbal Murrieta (1923)
Patronato Santa Eulalia (1914)
Home and clinical San Juan de Dios (1925)
Oriol Palace (1913)
Science of navigation school (1860) and Hijas de la Cruz college (1863)
Virgen del Mar church (1901)
Fishermen Confraternity (1916)
Town Park (1918) and Central Kiosk (1917)
Mamariga fountain (1882)
Monument to the Sardinera (1964)
Fishing Port (1916) and Virgin of Carmen (1950)
Museum of Sculptures
Monument to Miguel de Unamuno
Señorío de Vizcaya Square (redesign 2007)

References

External links
 Official website (in Basque / Spanish)
 Santurce-Santurtzi in the Bernardo Estornés Lasa - Auñamendi Encyclopedia (Euskomedia Fundazioa) 

Municipalities in Biscay
Estuary of Bilbao
Fishing communities
Port cities and towns on the Spanish Atlantic coast